The KLM-Line describes a very successful Russian  ice hockey lineup from the 1980s that consisted of the players Vladimir Krutov, Igor Larionov and Sergei  Makarov. It is widely considered to be the best European offensive lineup ever.

Origin 
It was a long tradition in the Soviet Union to discover and promote such ranks over the years. In the 1940s and 1950s there were Yevgeni Babich, Vsevolod Bobrov and  Viktor Shuvalov. In the 1970s there were Boris Mikhailov, Valeri Kharlamov and Vladimir Petrov, who were then included in the  KLM series  'that dominated the Soviet and international scene during the 1980s.

The Soviet national coach Viktor Tikhonov first discovered the talented skater and  left-handed shooter Sergei Makarov. Tikhonov then brought him to HK CSKA Moscow.

Vladimir Krutov, a very stocky and powerful left  wing, was discovered by Valeri Kharlamov. Krutov had been educated and trained at CSKA and was a great support for the army club at the time.

Voskresensk-born Igor Larionov, the later  center of the series was discovered by Nikolay Epshtein while playing for Khimik Voskresensk.

Soviet  National team 

Each of them won numerous prizes and championships, but they were particularly strong as a team: Together with the defenders Viacheslav Fetisov and Alexei Kasatonov they formed the first block for years of the  Soviet national team and were instrumental in their successes at that time. 

When these three players entered the ice hockey scene during the 1981 Canada Cup, they were only 21 (Krutov and Larionov) and 23 (Makarov) years old, but they were already stars. They scored 22 points (11 + 11) in seven games during the tournament and were the unit of measurement within the Soviet group. So they also won the final against Canada with 8:1. They also beat the best of the NHL in the 1979 Challenge Cup by winning the final, decisive game 6-0 !

In the 1984 Canada Cup  the KLM series collected another 18 points (10 + 8) in six games. However, they lost the semifinals to Canada 2-3 in overtime.

 1987 played the KLM series again at the  Canada Cup and fought a duel with the storm series for  Goulet -  Gretzky -  Lemieux from the Canadian national team. The KLM series scored 32 points (15 + 17) in reach nine games.

Other rows with the same name 
Also referred to as the "KLM line" is a lineup  combination of the Dallas Stars, which particularly stood out in the  2003/04 season. It consisted of Niko Kapanen, Jere Lehtinen and Brenden Morrow.

References

Ice hockey strategy
Ice hockey terminology
Ice hockey in Russia